Sigela is a genus of moths in the family Erebidae. The genus was erected by George Duryea Hulst in 1896.

Taxonomy
The genus was previously classified in the subfamily Acontiinae of the family Noctuidae.

Species
 Sigela basipunctaria Walker, 1861
 Sigela brauneata (Swett, 1913) (formerly Quandara brauneata)
 Sigela eoides Barnes & McDunnough, 1913 (misspelling Sigela coides)
 Sigela holopolia Dyar, 1914
 Sigela leucozona Hampson, 1910
 Sigela mathetes Dyar, 1914
 Sigela ormensis Schaus, 1914
 Sigela penumbrata Hulst, 1896
 Sigela sodis Dyar, 1914

References

Scolecocampinae
Moth genera